Yevgeniya Anatolyevna Shapovalova (born 15 June 1986 in Nizhny Tagil) is a Russian cross-country skier who has been competing since 2006.

Career
At the 2010 Winter Olympics, she finished 28th in the individual sprint event.

At the FIS Nordic World Ski Championships 2007 in Sapporo, Shapovalova finished 12th in the team sprint and 19th in the individual sprint events.

Her lone World Cup victory was in a sprint event in China in 2007.

In December 2016, FIS provisionally suspended six Russian cross-country skiers linked to doping violations during the 2014 Winter Olympics, including Yevgeniya Shapovalova. She was officially disqualified from the 2014 Winter Olympics by the International Olympic Committee on 9 November 2017. In January 2018,  she successfully appealed against the lifetime ban as well as decision to disqualify her from Sochi Olympics at the Court of Arbitration for Sport.

Cross-country skiing results
All results are sourced from the International Ski Federation (FIS).

Olympic Games

World Championships

World Cup

Season standings

Individual podiums
1 victory – (1 ) 
3 podiums – (2 , 1 )

Team podiums

 2 podiums – (2 )

References

External links
 

1986 births
Living people
Russian female cross-country skiers
Tour de Ski skiers
Cross-country skiers at the 2010 Winter Olympics
Cross-country skiers at the 2014 Winter Olympics
Olympic cross-country skiers of Russia
Russian sportspeople in doping cases
Doping cases in cross-country skiing
People from Nizhny Tagil
Sportspeople from Sverdlovsk Oblast